Joseph Hilton or Joe Hilton is the name of:

Joe Hilton (footballer, born 1931), English footballer
Joe Hilton (footballer, born 1999), English footballer
Joseph Hilton Smyth, American publisher and author